Keeper of the Seven Keys: The Legacy is the eleventh studio album by German power metal band Helloween, released in 2005. It is the first album with new and current drummer Dani Löble and a continuation to their 1987 and 1988 albums Keeper of the Seven Keys, Parts I and II. The album is a double CD with nearly 80 minutes playing time and comes in a digipack with 6 flaps. It was produced by Charlie Bauerfeind (Blind Guardian, Halford, Rage) and features Blackmore's Night singer Candice Night on the track "Light The Universe".  The album’s opening track, “King for 1000 Years” is, to date, the longest song released by the band.

When asked about what inspired them to make a third Keeper album, bassist Markus Grosskopf said:

The intro of the song "Occasion Avenue" uses samples from "Halloween", "Eagle Fly Free" and "Keeper of the Seven Keys" with Michael Kiske on vocals.  One of the samples is a clip from a previously unreleased live version of "Keys" with Kiske singing the first part of the chorus and the crowd joining in.

Track listing

Disc one

Disc two

Personnel
Andi Deris – vocals, additional keyboards
Michael Weikath – guitar
Sascha Gerstner – guitar, additional keyboards
Markus Grosskopf – bass
Dani Löble – drums

Guest musicians
Friedel Amon - keyboards
Backing vocals by Oliver Hartmann and Olaf Senkbeil
Candice Night - guest vocal on "Light the Universe"
Michael Kiske - cameo vocals on "Occasion Avenue"

Credits
Produced by Charlie Bauerfeind
Recorded, engineered, mixed & mastered by Charlie Bauerfeind at Mi Sueno Studio in Tenerife, Spain
Backing vocals recorded by Charlie Bauerfeind at House of Music Studios in Winterbach, Germany
Vocals of Candice Night recorded at Cove Studios by Pat Regan
Design and cover artwork by Martin Häusler
Photography by Mathias Bothor

Charts

References 

2005 albums
Helloween albums
SPV/Steamhammer albums
Albums produced by Charlie Bauerfeind
Sequel albums